François Tracanelli (born 4 February 1951) is a retired pole vaulter from France, who was born in Italy.

International competitions

References

1951 births
Living people
French male pole vaulters
Athletes (track and field) at the 1972 Summer Olympics
Athletes (track and field) at the 1976 Summer Olympics
Olympic athletes of France
Universiade medalists in athletics (track and field)
Sportspeople from Udine
Universiade gold medalists for France
Universiade bronze medalists for France
Medalists at the 1970 Summer Universiade
Medalists at the 1973 Summer Universiade
Medalists at the 1975 Summer Universiade